Acinia corniculata, is a species of fruit fly in the family Tephritidae.

Description
Britain Scandinavia, France, Italy, Balkans & Ukraine.

References

Tephritinae
Diptera of Europe
Insects described in 1819